Fire Maple Games is a game development studio known for creating "The Secret of Grisly Manor," which has reached #1 paid iPhone app in 16 stores and has been downloaded more than 3.5 million times. This success was replicated by their later release "The Lost City."

Fire Maple Games uses Corona SDK to develop mobile applications.

Published games 
The Great International Word Search! for Mac OS
The Secret of Grisly Manor for Android and iOS
The Lost City for Android, iOS, Kindle and NOOK
The Hidden World for Android, iOS, Kindle Fire & NOOK
Akkadia for Windows PC XP or Vista and Mac OS 10.4 or later
Stunt Squirrels for Android, iOS, Kindle and NOOK
Danger Cats for Android, iOS, Kindle and NOOK 
Return to Grisly Manor for Android and iOS.
Thickety Creek for Android and iOS
Curse of the Cobra for Android and iOS

References

External links 
Fire maple Games website
Corona SDK Post
Corona SDK statistics
Information Week sales results

Video game companies of the United States
Video game development companies